Fortress is a shooter video game developed by CCR Inc and published by Netsgo. The game spawned an animated series, Tank Knights Fortress, and a sequel, Fortress 2. On November 18, 2011, service for the game was terminated in South Korea and Japan.

References

2001 video games
Multiplayer online games
Shooter video games
Video games developed in South Korea
Windows games
Windows-only games